Jackson Municipal Airport  is a city-owned public-use airport located two nautical miles (2.3 mi, 3.7 km) north of the central business district of Jackson, a city in Jackson County, Minnesota, United States. It is included in the FAA's National Plan of Integrated Airport Systems for 2011–2015, which categorized it as a general aviation facility.

Facilities and aircraft 
It has two runways: 13/31 is 3,591 by 75 feet (1,095 x 23 m) with an asphalt surface; 4/22 is 2,250 by 300 feet (686 x 91 m) with a turf surface.

For the 12-month period ending June 30, 2010, the airport had 19,000 aircraft operations, an average of 52 per day: 99% general aviation, 1% air taxi, and <1% military. At that time there were 17 single-engine aircraft based at this airport.

References

External links 
 Jackson Municipal Airport at City of Jackson website
  at Minnesota DOT Airport Directory
 Aerial photo as of 5 May 1992 from USGS The National Map
 

Airports in Minnesota
Buildings and structures in Jackson County, Minnesota